Karlsruhe's University of Music (Hochschule für Musik Karlsruhe in German) is a college of music in Karlsruhe, Germany. Originally the Baden Conservatory of Music, it was elevated to a Hochschule under the direction of Franz Philipp, who led the school from 1924 to 1942.

Studies
The Hochschule für Musik Karlsruhe offers tuition in voice, orchestral instruments, piano, composition, music theory, musicology, music informatics and music journalism. The academic degrees go from Bachelors to Artists Diplomas.

Notable faculty
 Hanno Müller-Brachmann (born 1970), voice
 Wolfgang Meyer (1954–2019), clarinet
 Wolfgang Rihm (born 1952), composition

Notable alumni
 Tanja Ariane Baumgartner
 Clara Mathilda Faisst (1872–1948)
 Tarja Turunen
 Simone Zgraggen

See also
Music schools in Germany

References

External links
 Official website
 "Bach in the West Bank – a young Palestinian flutist accepted in the Karlsruhe University of Music" by Kate Hairsine, Deutsche Welle, December  2012

 
Universities and colleges in Karlsruhe
1971 establishments in West Germany
Educational institutions established in 1971
Music schools in Germany